The USA Falcons was one of two national representative rugby union teams from the United States that competed in the North America 4 Series.

History

Formation
The Falcons were founded in 2005 by the NA4 Committee.  The NA4 Committee is made up of the International Rugby Board, Rugby Canada and USA Rugby.  The committee is charged with operating and financing the four North American teams (the others being the USA Hawks, Canada East, and Canada West.  In 2008, however, each franchise will be sold and become privately owned.

Inaugural Competition: 2006 North America 4 Series
The Falcons' first ever match occurred on 20 May 2006 during the inaugural NA 4 Series.  They faced Canada East in pool play and won the match 29-14.  They finished the competition with a 3-2-0 record and had an average of 29 points scored and 23 points scored against per match.  They faced Canada West in the championship final and lost by a score of 20-31 on 29 July.  South African native Patrick Bell, of Life University, captained the squad during the inaugural campaign.

PARMA Select XV
The PARMA Select XV is the All-Star squad composed of the best players of the competition as determined by the Pan-American Rugby Media Association.  Patrick Bell, Hayden Mexted, Mark Aylor, Vaha Esikia, Andrew “Tui” Osborne, and Brian Barnard were selected to the starting XV.  John Tarpoff, Alex Parker, Chad Erskine, and Jason Pye were named as reserves.  Of the 22 spots on the PARMA XV, 10 were from the Falcons squad, the most of any NA4 club.

2006 squad
The 2006 NA4 squad is as follows

 Jarvis Albury - Arkansas State
 James Angus - Frederick
 Kevin Armstrong - Santa Monica Rugby Club
 Mark Aylor - Austin Blacks
 Brian Barnard - San Francisco Golden Gate
 Patrick Bell - Life
 Matt Brown - OPSB
 Chris Cowan - Santa Monica Rugby Club
 Aaron Davis - Santa Monica Rugby Club
 Vaha Esikia - Las Vegas Blackjacks
 Chad Erskine - OMBAC
 James Finau - Hayward
 Mike French - OMBAC
 Mark Griffin - Old Blue
 Carl Hansen - Olympic Club
 Jeff Hullinger - BYU
 Scott Jones - Chicago Lions
 Kimball Kjar - Dallas Harlequins
 Saimone Laulaupeaalu - Hayward
 Sean Kim - Charlotte Rugby Club
 Andrew Locke - USMA
 Hayden Mexted - St. Louis Bombers
 Andrew Osborne - Washington
 Alec Parker - Aspen
 Mike Petrie - Penn State
 Tony Petruzzella - Olympic Club
 Jason Pye - Utah
 David Rader - New York Athletic Club
 Ronald Rosser - Caly Poly
 Doug Rowe  - Old Blue
 Brian Schoener - OPSB
 Kort Schubert - Cardiff
 Garry Sullivan - Life
 John Tarpoff - St. Louis Bombers
 Alipate Tuilevuka - BYU
 John Vitale - Chicago Lions

References

American rugby union teams
North America 4 teams
Rugby clubs established in 2005
2005 establishments in the United States